Niemen Vol. 1 and Niemen Vol. 2 (also called "Marionetki" - "Puppets") - Czesław Niemen's double album released in two separate issues in 1973. In 1994 released on single CD by Digiton under title "Marionetki".

Niemen Vol. 1

Track listing 
 Requiem dla Van Gogha - 17:37 (music and lyrics Helmut Nadolski)
 Sariusz - 3:06 (lyrics Cyprian Kamil Norwid)
 Inicjały - 12:53 (instrumental, music by all band members)

Personnel 
Józef Skrzek - organ, piano, violin, bass, harmonica, vocal
Jerzy Piotrowski - drums
Antymos Apostolis - guitar
Helmut Nadolski - double bass
Andrzej Przybielski - trumpet
Czesław Niemen - organ, piano, vocal

Niemen Vol. 2

Track listing 
 Marionetki - 4:10 (lyrics Cyprian Kamil Norwid)
 Piosenka dla zmarłej - 13:49 (lyrics Jarosław Iwaszkiewicz)
 Z pierwszych ważniejszych odkryć - 9:17 (music Józef Skrzek, lyrics Leszek Aleksander Moczulski)
 Ptaszek - 1:07 (lyrics Maria Pawlikowska-Jasnorzewska)
 Com uczynił - 7:39 (lyrics Bolesław Leśmian)

Personnel 
Józef Skrzek - organ, piano, violin, bass, harmonica, vocal
Jerzy Piotrowski - drums
Antymos Apostolis - guitar
Helmut Nadolski - double bass
Andrzej Przybielski - trumpet
Czesław Niemen - organ, piano, vocal

Alternative covers 

Czesław Niemen albums
1976 albums